Notosyrphus  is a genus of hoverflies.

Species
N. golbachi Vockeroth, 1969

References

Diptera of South America
Hoverfly genera
Syrphini